Leptanilla besucheti is a species of ant. It is found in Sri Lanka.

References

External links

 at antwiki.org
Animaldiversity.org
Itis.org

Leptanillinae
Hymenoptera of Asia
Insects described in 1977